The Galesburg, IL Micropolitan Statistical Area, as defined by the United States Census Bureau, is an area consisting of two counties in west central Illinois, anchored by the city of Galesburg.

As of the 2000 census, the μSA had a population of 74,571 (though a July 1, 2009 estimate placed the population at 69,057).

Counties
Knox
Warren

Communities

Places with more than 30,000 inhabitants
Galesburg (Principal city)

Places with 1,000 to 10,000 inhabitants
Abingdon
Knoxville
Monmouth
Roseville

Places with 500 to 1,000 inhabitants
Alexis (partial)
Altona
East Galesburg
Kirkwood
Oneida
Wataga
Williamsfield
Yates City

Places with fewer than 500 inhabitants
Henderson
Little York
London Mills (partial)
Maquon
Rio
St. Augustine
Victoria

Unincorporated places

Appleton
Berwick
Cameron
Columbia Heights
Dahinda
Delong
Eleanor
Gerlaw
Gilson

Henderson Grove
Hermon
Larchland
Oak Run
Ormonde
Smithshire
Swan Creek
Youngstown

Townships

Knox County

 Cedar Township
 Chestnut Township
 Copley Township
 Elba Township
 Galesburg Township
 Haw Creek Township
 Henderson Township
 Indian Point Township
 Knox Township
 Lynn Township

 Maquon Township
 Ontario Township
 Orange Township
 Persifer Township
 Rio Township
 Salem Township
 Sparta Township
 Truro Township
 Victoria Township
 Walnut Grove Township

Warren County

 Berwick Township
 Cold Brook Township
 Ellison Township
 Floyd Township
 Greenbush Township
 Hale Township
 Kelly Township
 Lenox Township

 Monmouth Township
 Point Pleasant Township
 Roseville Township
 Spring Grove Township
 Sumner Township
 Swan Township
 Tompkins Township

Demographics
As of the census of 2000, there were 74,571 people, 29,222 households, and 19,390 families residing within the μSA. The racial makeup of the μSA was 91.30% White, 5.11% African American, 0.19% Native American, 0.60% Asian, 0.04% Pacific Islander, 1.45% from other races, and 1.32% from two or more races. Hispanic or Latino of any race were 3.22% of the population.

The median income for a household in the μSA was $35,816, and the median income for a family was $43,224. Males had a median income of $31,258 versus $21,058 for females. The per capita income for the μSA was $17,466.

See also
Illinois statistical areas

References

 
Geography of Knox County, Illinois
Geography of Warren County, Illinois
Micropolitan areas of Illinois